Awards and honours received by Siti Hartinah, the wife of the second Indonesian president, Suharto and First Lady of Indonesia from 1967 until 1996, include:

National honours

 namely:
  Star of the Republic of Indonesia, 2nd Class (10 March 1973)
  Guerrilla Star
  Star of Culture Parama Dharma (17 June 1992)

International honours
:
 Recipient of the Most Esteemed Family Order of Laila Utama (DK) (1988)
:
 Grand Cross of the Royal Order of Sowathara (1968)
:
 Honorary Recipient of the Most Exalted Order of the Crown of the Realm (DMN) (1988)
:
 Grand Collar of the Order of the Golden Heart (GCGH) (1968)
:
 Dame Grand Cross of the Most Illustrious Order of Chula Chom Klao (DGC) (1970)
:
 Grand Star (Groß-Stern) of the Decoration of Honour for Services to the Republic of Austria (1973)
:
 Dame Grand Cross of the Order of the Crown (1970)
:
 Grand Cordon and Collar of the Order of the Queen of Sheba (1968)
:
 Grand Cordon of the Order of the Precious Crown (1968)
:
 Grand Cross Special Class of the Order of Merit of the Federal Republic of Germany
:
 First Class of the Order of Kuwait (1977)
:
 Recipient of the Grand Order of Mugunghwa (1981)
:
 Supreme Class of the Order of the Virtues (Nishan al-Kamal) (1977)
:
 Grand Cross of the National Order of Merit (Ordre national du Mérite)
:
 The First Class of the Orders of Tudor Vladimirescu (1982)
:
 Dame Grand Cross of the Order of Isabella the Catholic (gcYC) (1980)
:
 Member 1st Class of the Order of the Umayyads (1977)
:
 Grand Cordon with Collar of the Order of the Liberator (1988)
:
 Grand Cordon of the Supreme Order of the Renaissance (1986)
:
 Yugoslav Star with Sash of the Order of the Yugoslav Star (1975)

References

Suharto family and associates
Cendana family
First ladies and gentlemen of Indonesia
Grand Crosses Special Class of the Order of Merit of the Federal Republic of Germany
Indonesia-related lists
Recipients of orders, decorations, and medals of Ethiopia